The 2021 Rugby Europe Women's Sevens Under 18 Trophy was held in Gdańsk, Poland, on the 16th and 17th of July. Seven teams competed in the tournament in a round-robin. Poland were undefeated and were crowned Champions.

Tournament

Squads

References 

2020–21 in European women's rugby union
2021 rugby sevens competitions